The 1895 Charleston earthquake, also known as the Halloween earthquake, occurred on October 31, at 05:07 CST near Charleston, Missouri. It had an estimated moment magnitude of 5.8–6.6 and evaluated Modified Mercalli intensity of VIII (Severe). The earthquake caused substantial property damage in the states of Missouri, Illinois, Ohio, Alabama, Iowa, Kentucky, Indiana, and Tennessee. Shaking was widespread, being felt across 23 states and even in Canada. At least two people died and seven were injured.

Tectonic setting
The New Madrid Seismic Zone located in the midcontinental United States is a region of concentrated seismic activity. This zone is within the Reelfoot Rift, a failed rift trending northeast. Faulting within the rift occasionally causes small to moderate earthquakes. In 1811–1812, a series of large earthquakes occurred on the rift, causing great devastation.

Martin and Hough postulated three different plausible events, a north-northwest rupture from Henson Lake to Charleston, a northeast rupture on the western boundary faults of the Reelfoot Rift, or north-northeast or north-northwest rupture within the rift. They concluded that the third event was most consistent with reports of the macroseismic effects, but not with liquefaction reports. It was also possible that the rupture involved more than one fault. Inferred aftershock locations suggest compatibility with the latter model, and agrees with the intensity distribution which suggest a northeast-propagating rupture. All three models indicate the earthquake was a buried rupture event along a  fault.

Earthquake

It has been widely accepted that the city of Charleston is the approximate location of the earthquake based on reports of soil liquefaction and strong shaking. Extensive documentation of its macroseismic effects were used by researchers to determine its magnitude. Most existing scientific journals agree that the magnitude was about magnitude 6.0 or larger. A 1996 paper estimated the magnitude to be 6.6  based on studying the intensity distribution. Recently (2019), seismologists Martin and Hough estimated the magnitude to be 5.8 .

No foreshock activity preceded the mainshock, and there are sparse documentation of aftershocks. However, at Elwood, Indiana, a three-second shock was felt at 07:15, on the day of the mainshock. The shock was not felt outside of the city. This may be a possible documented aftershock. One newspaper account stated that the ground "continued to vibrate for fully twenty minutes". In Cairo, Illinois, an aftershock was reported 15 minutes following the mainshock. This aftershock is thought to have been felt in Memphis, Tennessee; Hickman, Kentucky; and Hammond, Indiana. Another aftershock was felt on November 1, and another on December 31.

Damage
The earthquake is considered the largest and most destructive in the area since 1812. Building damage and liquefaction was observed along a linear path from Bertrand (MO) to Cairo (IL). Sand volcanoes were observed in some areas north and south of Charleston. Charleston experienced extensive damage; collapsed chimneys, broken windows and plasters occurred on schools, homes, churches and commercial buildings across the town. At Cairo, chimneys and windows of most buildings were destroyed. The town courthouse, library, and a church was seriously damaged. Many buildings large cracks to its brick walls. A pier on the Ohio River was cracked. It caused two deaths; one in Bardwell, Kentucky, where a man passed from a "fright", and another in Avery, Iowa, where a worker was killed by falling slate at a mine. An explosion due to a ruptured gas pipe at Cincinnati, Ohio injuring seven people.

In Chicago, Illinois, all 12,000 telephone exchange were activated simultaneously. Many residents were awakened by rattling windows, although there was minimal damage. At St. Louis, Missouri, frightened residents rushed out of their homes. There was relatively little damage to old masonry buildings. Two chimneys in Memphis, Tennessee toppled during the shaking. Light shaking was felt at McKeesport and Bellevue, Pennsylvania. Buildings as far away as Indianapolis and Kansas City shook, awakening residents.

See also
List of historical earthquakes
List of earthquakes in the United States
List of earthquakes in Illinois

References

1895 earthquakes
Earthquakes in Missouri
Earthquakes in Illinois
1895 in Missouri
1895 in Illinois
October 1895 events
Mississippi County, Missouri
Earthquakes in Ohio
Earthquakes in Iowa
1895 in Iowa
1895 in Ohio
1895 in Tennessee
Buried rupture earthquakes